Clíodhna Lyons is an Irish cartoonist, animator and printmaker who has created several comics and zines and is now a director for Brown Bag Films.

Biography
Lyons was born in the Aran Islands, Galway but went to study animation in Ballyfermot College in Dublin before going to complete a BFA in comics at the School of Visual Arts in New York. Lyons has worked with a number of other artists such as Maeve Clancy. Lyons is based in London though she was previously based in Kilkenny when she was working at the Cartoon Saloon. She travels to Dublin regularly due to the comics related events 24 Hour Comics Day which she helps run.

Bibliography
 The Green Fields of France (2004)
 Nightswimming (2005)
 The Art of Cake Diving (2007)
 Sorry I can't take your call right now but I'm off saving the world (2008)
 The Comics Foodpedia (2009)
 Cheap Thrills (2010) 
 Threes (2010)

External sources

References and sources

Living people
21st-century Irish women writers
Irish female comics artists
Irish comics artists
Irish women animators
Irish animators
People from County Galway
Year of birth missing (living people)